Jocelyn Seagrave (born September 9, 1968) is an American film and television actress, best known for playing Julie Camaletti on Guiding Light and Jessica Mitchell on Fox's Pacific Palisades.

Early life
Seagrave's father was American author and historian Sterling Seagrave and her paternal grandfather, Gordon Stifler Seagrave, was the author of Burma Surgeon. Seagrave's mother, Wendy Law-Yone, was born in 1947 in Mandalay, Burma, she was raised and educated in  Bangkok, Thailand is now living in the United States. Seagrave has English, Chinese and Burmese ancestry on her maternal side. Her maternal grandfather, Edward Michael Law-Yone, was a journalist and writer, as well as the founder of The Nation, once the leading English-language newspaper in Burma. Seagrave grew up in Thailand and later in the US. She studied martial arts, and earning her black belt in Tae Kwon Do, and English literature at the University of Virginia. She attended Robert Frost Junior High School in Fairfax, Virginia and then Annandale High School in Annandale, Virginia.

Acting career
 
Her background has been the interest of many TV viewers since her acting debut on Guiding Light as Julie Camaletti from 1991 to 1994, in which she won millions of fans from the role. Seagrave has been a series regular on Fox's Pacific Palisades, produced by Aaron Spelling, and has also appeared in Savannah, Charmed, Wings, other television shows and independent films. She is a writer as well, with screenplays, stage plays, short stories and poems to her credit.

Personal life
In 1993, Seagrave married Ted Fundoukos from Akron, Ohio. They have two children.

Filmography

References

External links

1968 births
American film actresses
American television actresses
American soap opera actresses
Actresses from Washington, D.C.
University of Virginia alumni
Thai emigrants to the United States
American people of Anglo-Burmese descent
American people of Burmese descent
American people of Chinese descent
American people of English descent
Living people
Jocelyn Seagrave
20th-century American actresses
21st-century American actresses
Annandale High School alumni